Chang Cheh (10 February 1923 – 22 June 2002) was a Chinese filmmaker, screenwriter, lyricist and producer active in the 1960s, 1970s and 1980s. Chang Cheh directed more than 90 films in Greater China, the majority of them with the Shaw Brothers Studio in Hong Kong. Most of his films are action films, especially wuxia and kung fu films filled with violence.

In the early 1970s he frequently cast actors David Chiang and Ti Lung in his films. In the late 1970s he mainly worked with a group of actors known as the Venom Mob. Chang Cheh is also known for his long-time collaboration with writer Ni Kuang.

Career
Referred to as "The Godfather of Hong Kong cinema", Chang directed nearly 100 films in his illustrious career at Shaw Brothers, which ran the gamut from swordplay films (One-Armed Swordsman, The Assassin, Golden Swallow) to kung fu films (Five Shaolin Masters, Five Venoms, Kid with the Golden Arm) to more modern period dramas (Chinatown Kid, Boxer From Shantung, The Generation Gap) to lavish costume epics (The Water Margin, The Heroic Ones, Boxer Rebellion).

After graduating from National Central University (Nanjing University) in Chungking (Chongqing), where he studied politics, Chang moved to Hong Kong, where he became a film critic. Chang got his start in the film industry as a screenwriter; his first script was Girl's Mask, a movie from Shanghai which was released in 1947.  He wrote several more scripts before making his directorial debut in 1949 with Happenings in Ali Shan.  His first big hit came with 1967's One-Armed Swordsman, the first film in Hong Kong history to gross HK$1 million.  The film catapulted actor Jimmy Wang Yu to stardom and cemented Chang's status as one of Hong Kong's top directors.  In the same year, he released The Assassin, another early Chang classic, and in 1968 he followed up with Golden Swallow, a sequel to King Hu's classic wuxia picture Come Drink With Me.

Chang often co-wrote scripts with fellow screenwriter Ni Kuang, and occasionally co-directed films with directors such as Baau Hok-li, Wu Ma and Gwai Chi-hung.  He even occasionally wrote and co-wrote music for his films.  In addition to his film related work, he also wrote novels, poetry and non-film related articles under numerous pseudonyms.

Chang was heavily influenced by directors Akira Kurosawa, Hideo Gosha, Sergio Leone, and Sam Peckinpah, Cheh brought elements from these movies into his own work, revolutionizing Hong Kong filmmaking. His swordplay films of the 1960s (including One Armed Swordsman), filled with bloody scenes of the hero cutting his way through a roomful of opponents, were considered at the time by Westerners to be violent trash but are now looked back on as masterpieces of the genre.

In the early 1970s Chang began making kung fu films (including Five Shaolin Masters and Five Venoms) sometimes filming four or five movies in a single year.  His earlier kung fu movies were often done in collaboration with choreographer (and future director) Lau Kar Leung, who Chang had worked with, along with choreographer Tong Gaai, on earlier films.  After falling out with Lau on the set of Disciples of Shaolin, Chang started featuring a troupe of actors made up of Sun Chien, Chiang Sheng, Philip Kwok, Lo Meng, Lu Feng, Wei Pai (and Yu Tai Ping), who would come to be known as "The Venoms", as actors and choreographers in his films.  His films from this period, including Five Deadly Venoms, Kid with the Golden Arm, and Crippled Avengers, feature a heavy influence from the wuxia movie genre, and are considered his most popular films in the west – not counting 1982's Five Element Ninjas, aka Chinese Superninjas.

Chang was a pioneer of what is known by some as "heroic bloodshed"; films that emphasize brotherhood, loyalty and honor, and several of his films, including Vengeance, Boxer From Shantung and Chinatown Kid, can be seen as clear influences on the later work of directors such as John Woo and Ringo Lam.  His influence on future filmmakers such as Quentin Tarantino (who listed Chang as a dedicatee in the end credits of Kill Bill: Volume 2), Robert Rodriguez and Zhang Yimou is unquestionable. John Woo, who lists Cheh as his chief filmmaking inspiration, worked as assistant director on many of the master's films, including Boxer From Shantung, The Water Margin and The Blood Brothers.

Filmography

Films

TV series
In 1992, Chang produced Taiwan Television's Ma's Assassination (刺馬), which tells the same story as his 1973 film The Blood Brothers. The series is directed by Lu Feng and stars, among other actors, David Chiang.

As lyricist
Chang Cheh wrote the lyrics of more than 70 Chinese songs that have appeared in his films. The theme song of his directorial debut Happenings in Ali Shan, "Ali Shan de Guniang" (阿里山的姑娘; "Alishan Range's Girls"), also known as "Gao Shan Qing" (高山青; "The Green High Mountain") is a particularly famous song in the Sinophone world.

References

External links

Senses of Cinema: Great Directors Critical Database
Chang Cheh: the Godfather of the Kung Fu Film
Chang Cheh and other Shaw Bros. reviews at Cityonfire.com

1923 births
2002 deaths
Chinese film directors
Hong Kong film directors
Shaw Brothers Studio
National Central University alumni
Nanjing University alumni
Film directors from Shanghai
Writers from Shanghai
Chinese lyricists
Chinese emigrants to British Hong Kong